was a town located in Higashikunisaki District, Ōita Prefecture, Japan.

As of 2003, the town has an estimated population of 9,856 and the density of 108.61 persons per km². The total area is 90.75 km².

On March 31, 2006, Aki, along with the towns of Kunisaki (former), Kunimi and Musashi (all from Higashikunisaki District), was merged to create the city of Kunisaki.

External links
 Kunisaki official website 

Dissolved municipalities of Ōita Prefecture